Mads Petter Kaggestad (born February 22, 1977 in Ringerike) is a former Norwegian professional road racing cyclist. He competed for the French Crédit Agricole team between 2003 and 2007. During 2002 he was a member of the amateur Team Krone. He competed in the men's individual road race at the 2004 Summer Olympics.

He is the son of Johan Kaggestad, an athletics coach and television commentator.

Race won
2002
 Ringerike GP

References

External links 
 

1977 births
Living people
Norwegian male cyclists
Olympic cyclists of Norway
Cyclists at the 2004 Summer Olympics
People from Ringerike (municipality)
Sportspeople from Viken (county)